Voința Stadium is a multi-use stadium in Ghermănești, Romania. It is currently used mostly for football matches and is the home ground of Olimpic Snagov. The stadium holds 1,500 people.

Football venues in Romania
Buildings and structures in Ilfov County